Mr. Blue Sky: The Very Best of Electric Light Orchestra (also known as Mr. Blue Sky) is an album of re-recordings by Jeff Lynne of hits by Electric Light Orchestra. It was issued in 2012 by Frontiers simultaneously with Lynne's cover album Long Wave.

Background 
Jeff Lynne told Rolling Stone magazine that the idea came from him listening to the original Electric Light Orchestra recordings, and thinking that he could produce a better result having since had a long career as a record producer. Lynne decided to re-record a number of songs from scratch, and began with "Mr. Blue Sky". He told Rolling Stone: "I enjoyed doing that a lot, and when I listened back to it and compared it to the old one, I really liked it much better." It was suggested by his manager that Lynne record a few more versions of Electric Light Orchestra songs, the results being recordings of "Evil Woman" and "Strange Magic". Lynne also liked these versions, so he continued by producing a full album of re-recordings.

Release and content
The album features all new recordings of some of the group's hits, as well as two bonus tracks: a new song, "Point of No Return", and a live recording of "Twilight" on Japanese releases. The album debuted at number 8 on the UK Albums Chart and at number 2 on the UK Top 40 Independent Albums Chart, then also at number 118 on the US Billboard 200 albums chart, at number 29 on the Billboard Top Independent Albums chart and at number 46 on the Billboard Top Rock Albums chart.

Track listing 
All tracks written, produced, and performed by Jeff Lynne.

Japanese bonus track

iTunes Store "Deluxe edition" bonus tracks

Personnel
Personnel per album booklet:

Musicians
Jeff Lynne – lead vocals, background vocals, lead guitar, rhythm guitar, piano, bass, drums, keyboards, vocoder, cowbell, production, mixing, engineering
Marc Mann – string arrangements, Minimoog ("Turn to Stone"), engineering
Laura Lynne – background vocals ("Evil Woman", "Strange Magic", "Showdown", "Livin' Thing")
Steve Jay – shakers, tambourine, mixing, engineering
Ryan Ulyate – piano solo ("Evil Woman"), engineering
Howie Weinberg – mastering engineer
Dan Gerbarg – mastering engineer

Charts and certifications

Weekly charts

Certifications

References 

Electric Light Orchestra albums
Albums produced by Jeff Lynne
Covers albums
2012 greatest hits albums